The fruit tree borer (Maroga melanostigma) is a moth of the family Xyloryctidae. It is native to Australia.

The wingspan is about 40 mm. The adults have satin white forewings, with a black dot near the centre of the wing. The hindwings are grey. The body is black with yellow bands and a yellow tip. The upper part of the legs has orange hairs.

The moths confront threats by lying down on their back or side, extending the wings upwards and curling the abdomen to display the yellow tip.

The larvae feed on a wide range of trees, including Acacia species, especially Acacia mearnsii. The species is considered a pest on Ulmus × hollandica 'Wredei', Platanus orientalis, various maple species and Rosaceae species such as Malus pumila, Prunus armeniaca, Prunus avium, Prunus persica and Rubus idaeus. Other recorded foodplants include Cassia species, Wisteria sinensis, Carya illinoensis, Ficus carica, Citrus species, Lantana camara and Vitis vinifera.

Gallery

References

Maroga
Moths described in 1861